David John Burgess (born 20 January 1960 in Liverpool) is an English former professional footballer. He played as a right-back.

Burgess began his career at Tranmere Rovers in 1981, and went on to make over 200 league appearances for the Wirral club in five years.

In 1986, he signed for Grimsby Town. In two years at Blundell Park he made 69 appearances.

He returned to the west coast in 1988 when he joined Sam Ellis' Blackpool. He made just over 100 appearances for the Seasiders in five years, and was a member of the team that won the Fourth Division play-off final at Wembley in May 1992. This was after sitting out the entire 1990-91 season through injury.

During the following season he was loaned out to Carlisle United for a month, and made the move permanent later that season.

He spent a year with the Cumbrians, making 40 appearances and scoring one goal.

Another loan spell followed, this time at Hartlepool United, before moves to Northwich Victoria and Bamber Bridge, with whom he finished his career.

Honours

Blackpool
Fourth Division play-off winners: 1991-92

References

Profile at PlayerHistory.com

1960 births
Living people
English footballers
Tranmere Rovers F.C. players
Grimsby Town F.C. players
Blackpool F.C. players
Carlisle United F.C. players
Hartlepool United F.C. players
Northwich Victoria F.C. players
Bamber Bridge F.C. players
Footballers from Liverpool
Association football defenders